Hamza Akbar (born 28 October 1995) is a Pakistani cricketer. He made his first-class debut for Lahore Whites in the 2017–18 Quaid-e-Azam Trophy on 27 October 2017.

References

External links
 

1995 births
Living people
Pakistani cricketers
Lahore Whites cricketers